Grand Palace Hotel is a 5 star hotel in Riga, Latvia, in a building originally erected 1877 to house a bank, but now with 56 hotel rooms. Grand Palace Hotel is member of The Leading Hotels of the World, and has been voted as Latvia's Leading Hotel for six years, latest being in 2010.

References

External links
Official site

Hotels in Riga
Hotel buildings completed in 1877
1877 establishments in the Russian Empire